Tinwald may refer to:

Places 
 Tinwald, New Zealand
 Tinwald, Dumfries and Galloway, Scotland
 RAF Tinwald Downs, a Royal Air Force base, located near Tinwald

See also 
 Charles Erskine, Lord Tinwald (former Lord of Justiciary)
 Tinwald School
 Tynwald (disambiguation)